Ajay Khabra (born 13 June 1995) is a Canadian former professional soccer player.

Early life
Khabra was born in Edmonton, Alberta. Khabra started playing soccer with Edmonton Juventus and won a national championship there in 2009 at the under-14 level. He later joined the academy programme of local professional club FC Edmonton.

Club career

Early career
From 2013 to 2017, Khabra attended the University of Alberta, making 63 appearances and scoring 12 goals from 2013 to 2017.

While attending university, Khabra played for Alberta Major Soccer League side Edmonton Green & Gold, scoring eight goals in 32 appearances from 2016 to 2018.

FC Edmonton
On 13 December 2018, Khabra signed with his former youth club FC Edmonton ahead of its first season in the Canadian Premier League. On 4 May 2019, Khabra made his professional debut as a substitute against Valour FC. That season, he made 24 league appearances, including 21 starts.

Atlético Ottawa
On 9 March 2020, Khabra joined expansion side Atlético Ottawa. On 15 August 2020, he made his debut in Ottawa's inaugural match against York9 and went on to make a total of six appearances for Ottawa that season. On 20 February 2021, Khabra retired from the professional game to pursue further education in the field of rehabilitative medicine.

Coaching career
On 16 March 2021, Khabra rejoined Atlético Ottawa as an assistant coach under manager Mista.

Career statistics

References

External links

1995 births
Living people
Association football midfielders
Canadian soccer players
Soccer players from Edmonton
Canadian people of Indian descent
Alberta Golden Bears players
FC Edmonton players
Atlético Ottawa players
Canadian Premier League players
Canadian soccer coaches
Atlético Ottawa non-playing staff